Acalanthis is a genus of checkered beetles in the subfamily Egoliinae.

References 

 Arias, E.T.; Slipinski, A.; Lawrence, J.F.; Elgueta, M. 2009: A review of the Chilean Egoliini (Coleoptera: Trogossitidae) with description of a new species of Necrobiopsis Crowson. Zootaxa, 2170: 37–45

Trogossitidae
Cleridae genera